This is the results breakdown of the local elections held in the Basque Country on 26 May 1991. The following tables show detailed results in the autonomous community's most populous municipalities, sorted alphabetically.

Overall

City control
The following table lists party control in the most populous municipalities, including provincial capitals (shown in bold). Gains for a party are displayed with the cell's background shaded in that party's colour.

Municipalities

Barakaldo
Population: 108,588

Basauri
Population: 50,941

Bilbao
Population: 383,798

Donostia-San Sebastián
Population: 183,944

Getxo
Population: 81,795

Irun
Population: 55,200

Portugalete
Population: 57,156

Rentería
Population: 42,441

Santurtzi
Population: 51,706

Vitoria-Gasteiz
Population: 209,506

Juntas Generales

References

Basque Country
1991